"Do My Thing" is a song by American rapper Busta Rhymes. It was released as the third and last single from his debut studio album The Coming. It was written by Rhymes and producer DJ Scratch. Originally released as a promotional single in 1996 along with "Abandon Ship", which also appears on The Coming, the song was then released as the third single from the album in the United Kingdom in 1997, where it peaked at number 39 on the UK Singles Chart.

Composition
"Do My Thing" was written by Rhymes and its producer DJ Scratch. The song is composed in  time and the key of B minor, with a tempo of 82 beats per minute. It has a duration of four minutes.

Critical reception
"Do My Thing" received positive reception with Daryl McIntosh of Albumism highlighting that the song along with the following song on The Coming, "Everything Remains Raw", "provide no distractions and illuminate how Busta's humor and knowledge can seep through a track while simultaneously highlighting his great rhyming".

Charts

References

1996 songs
1997 singles
Busta Rhymes songs
Hip hop songs
Songs written by Busta Rhymes
Elektra Records singles